, or    is a national university in Shiga Prefecture, Japan, with campuses in the cities of Ōtsu and Hikone. Founded in 1874, it was chartered as a university in 1949.

Faculties & Graduate Schools

Shiga University has three faculties, the Faculty of Education in Ōtsu Campus, the Faculty of Economics and the Faculty of Data Science, the first for faculty in Japan, in Hikone Campus. Each faculty 
has a graduate school.

See also "The improvement work of Shiga University Auditorium"

The Faculty of Education 

The Faculty of Education consists of three departments:

(1) Department of School Teachers' Training,
which aims to develop teachers with attractive personality as well as practical leadership to 
respond productively to the new school education;

(2) Department of Environment Education, which 
aims to enhance understanding of current environmental systems and problems and encourage students to 
create new ways to solve problems they are facing.

Graduate School of Education 

School Education (Master's Degree)

School Education offers 3 courses: Educational Science, Special Education, and Development of Teaching Materials

(1) Educational Science

The Educational Science course offers classes focusing on educational foundations and methods, development and learning.

Educational Science
Special Education

(2) The Special Education course offers classes focusing on the theory of educational practice, classes focusing on neuropsychology and clinical child development, and classes focusing on medicine for disabled children.

Special Education

(3) Development of Teaching Materials

The Development of Teaching Materials course offers various specialization classes, with subject education, teaching material development, and lesson observation, and includes practical and theoretical education research.

Japanese Education
Social Studies Education
Mathematics Education
Science Education
Music Education
Visual Arts Education
Health and Physical Education
Technology Education
Home Economics Education
English Education
Environmental Education 

Advanced Professional Development for Teachers (Professional Degree Program in Education)

Advanced Professional Development for Teachers offers 2 courses: the Professional Development Course for School Management and the Professional Development Course for Curriculum and Instruction, Guidance, Classroom Management.

(1) Professional Development Course for School Management

The Professional Development Course for School Management is aimed at currently practicing teachers and focuses on improving school management skills.

Professional Development Course for School Management

(2) Professional Development Course for Curriculum and Instruction, Guidance, Classroom Management

The Professional Development Course for Curriculum and Instruction, Guidance, Classroom Management is aimed at fresh graduates from the Faculty of Education and currently practicing teachers, and focuses on improving practical skills, including lesson and class management skills.

Professional Development Course for Curriculum and Instruction, Guidance, Classroom Management

The Faculty of Economics 
The Faculty of Economics consists of six departments. All disciplines of Economics aim to develop specialists in economics with a global perspective and a problem solving ability capable of responding to the needs of a global information society.

Graduate School of Economics 

Objective

The academic objective of the Graduate School of Economics is to develop professionals with advanced expertise, as well as specialist researchers in specific fields. The common goal is educating global specialists, namely, businesspeople with a broad-based acumen and advanced expertise that speaks volumes in this age of globalization.

Overview

With the doctoral program in Economic and Business Risk established in 2003, the Graduate School of Economics now comprises three master's programs and one doctoral program. An outgrowth of the master's program in "Economics" (Accounting and Management) established in 1955, the School made a new start in 1973 with two master's programs in "Economics" and "Business administration", and added a master's program in "Global Finance", geared more to the development of professionals with advanced skills, in 2001.

The Graduate School of Economics aims to train professionals with advanced expertise, as well as specialist researchers in specific fields. The Master's Program comprises three fields of specialization as above-mentioned, and the Doctoral Program comprises three fields of education and research which are "Basic Research in Risk Analysis", "Research in Risk Management" and "Research in Risk and Creativity".

The Faculty of Data Science 
The Department of Data Science is the first for faculty in Japan to meet a real society demand for rich imaginative leaders who use data efficiently. The curriculum provides the latest science in 21st century called “data science” (data centric science) which transcends conventional informatics and statistics along with the development of ICT (Information and Communication Technology).

Graduate School of Data Science 
The Graduate School of Data Science offers the curriculum to learn project management and models unique to application domains as well as methodologies of data science and real-world examples. By understanding real-world data and experiencing the process of problem-solving through project research, students will not only acquire knowledge but also experience success in problem-solving and gain the ability to create values from data.

History
The predecessor of the current school, the Shiga College of Education, was established in 1943 which originated from the Shiga Normal School, so-renamed in 1875 one year later after founded as the Training Institute for Elementary School Teachers in 1874.  Thereafter in 1949 three colleges, namely the above-mentioned Shiga College of Education, Shiga Teachers Training College and Hikone Commercial College known as Hikone Kōshō which was founded in 1922, were combined into one institution and it was chartered as a university.

The Otsu campus of Shiga University has its origin in the establishment of Shiga Normal School in Otsu in 1874. This school was reorganized as the Shiga College of Education in 1943. Upon the founding of Shiga University in May, 1949, the Shiga College of Education and the Shiga Teachers Training College were brought together as the Faculty of Liberal Arts.

The Hikone campus has its origin in the establishment of the Hikone Commercial College in 1922 when Kizo Yasui as the town mayor of Hikone (Then Hikone was not a city but a town under the old system) had been making every effort to establish this college. This college was reorganized in 1944 as the Hikone College of Economics. At the time Shiga University was founded in May, 1949, the college had become the Faculty of Economics.

The administrative offices of the university are located on the Hikone campus.

The following table shows the development and reorganization of Shiga University since its foundation in 1949:

As a base university selected by MEXT
Shiga University together with Hokkaido University, University of Tokyo, Kyoto University, Osaka University and kyushu University is one of the 6 base universities for education of applied mathematics and data science selected by MEXT (Ministry of Education, Culture, Sports, Science and Technology).

Student activities
Shiga University offers a wide variety of clubs and circles.

Further information : Extracurricular activities (clubs and circles)

SIFE National Champion & World Cup semifinalist 
In 2010, Shiga University team of Students in Free Enterprise (SIFE), which won twice in Japan in 2007 and 2010 by beating Kyoto University, Waseda University, Keio University and so on, became the first-ever Japanese semifinalist of SIFE World Cup.

Evaluation from Business World

Notable people
 Yoshiji Fukushima, businessperson
 Hirotaro Higuchi, businessperson
 Kakuzo Kawamoto, businessperson and politician
 Gentaro Kawase, businessperson
 Koji Kobayashi, businessperson
 Masahiro Murakami, businessperson
 Shoji Nishida, politician
 Yoshiomi Tamai, activist, philanthropist and educator
 Sōsuke Uno, prime minister

References

External links
 Official website
 Introduction of 13 National Universities in Kinki Region starting with Shiga University

Educational institutions established in 1943
Japanese national universities
Universities and colleges in Shiga Prefecture
Buildings and structures in Ōtsu
1943 establishments in Japan
Kansai Collegiate American Football League
Ōtsu
Hikone, Shiga